Elaine Margaret Burdett (born December 22, 1996) is an American soccer player who plays as a goalkeeper for Åland United in the Finnish Kansallinen Liiga.

Early life 
Burdett grew up in Las Vegas and played club soccer for Heat FC.

Arizona Wildcats 
Burdett played collegiate soccer at the University of Arizona in the Pac-12 Conference, becoming the winningest goalkeeper in school history and setting a record for most clean sheets in program history with 26 shutouts. She finished with a 79.7% career save percentage.

While in Arizona, Burdett also played with local Women's Premier Soccer League side FC Tucson.

Professional career

Orlando Pride 
Burdett went undrafted in the 2019 NWSL College Draft but joined Orlando Pride on trial during preseason and was signed to the team's supplemental roster on April 10 ahead of the 2019 season. She made her professional debut on October 5, starting in the penultimate game of the season at home to Washington Spirit. Burdett earned an NWSL save of the week award in Orlando's 3–0 loss. Burdett was waived on June 21, 2020, ahead of the start of the 2020 NWSL Challenge Cup.

Åland United 
In December 2021, Burdett signed with Finnish Kansallinen Liiga team Åland United ahead of the 2022 season.

Career statistics

References

External links 
 
NWSL profile
Wildcats bio

1996 births
Living people
American women's soccer players
Arizona Wildcats women's soccer players
Orlando Pride players
National Women's Soccer League players
Soccer players from Las Vegas
People from Las Vegas
Women's association football goalkeepers
Kansallinen Liiga players
Åland United players
American expatriate women's soccer players
Expatriate women's footballers in Finland
American expatriate sportspeople in Finland